Barbara Piton (born 27 March 1977) is a French former ice dancer. With her brother, Alexandre Piton, she is the 1994 Nebelhorn Trophy champion, the 1995 Karl Schäfer Memorial silver medalist, and a three-time French national medalist, having won one silver and two bronze medals. She competed in the final segment at four ISU Championships, skating in partnership with Benjamin Delmas and her brother.

Personal life 
Barbara Piton was born on 27 March 1977 in Châlons-sur-Marne, France. She is the sister of French ice dancer Alexandre Piton.

Skating career 
Early in her ice dancing career, Piton skated with Benjamin Delmas. The two finished 14th at the 1992 World Junior Championships in Hull, Quebec, Canada.

Partnership with Alexandre Piton 
By 1994, Piton had teamed up with her brother, Alexandre Piton. Catherine Glaise served as their coach. The siblings belonged to Association des Sports de Glace Châlonnais and represented France internationally. They competed in the final segment at three ISU Championships, placing 20th at the 1995 Worlds in Birmingham, England, 12th at the 1996 Europeans in Sofia, Bulgaria, and 20th at the 1996 Worlds in Edmonton, Alberta, Canada. They appeared at six Champions Series (Grand Prix) events.

The Piton siblings competed at the 2005 German Championships, taking the bronze medal, but never appeared for Germany internationally. They retired from competition in 2005.

Later career 
Piton has worked as a skating coach at Association des Sports de Glace Châlonnais.

Programs 
(with Alexandre Piton)

Competitive highlights 
GP: Champions Series (Grand Prix)

With Alexandre Piton

With Benjamin Delmas

References 

1977 births
French female ice dancers
Living people
People from Châlons-en-Champagne
Sportspeople from Marne (department)
20th-century French women